Smog Veil Records was a Chicago, IL based independent record label. In addition to standard CD, DVD, and vinyl distribution, Smog Veil also distributed its media via digital channels, including Napster and iTunes.

History 
In business from 1991 until 2021, Smog Veil Records focused primarily on underground, challenging, unknown, and/or bombastic rock’n’roll from artists based in Northeast Ohio and Cleveland. Co-owner Frank Mauceri stated that the company had a green initiative, and that its headquarters were powered by wind and solar energy. The label closed in December 2021.

Artists 
 Agitated
 Amoeba (raft boy)
 Amps 2 Eleven
 Axemaster
 Broke
 Buzz Clic/Bold Chicken
 California Speedbag
 Cheese Borger and The Cleveland Steamers
 David Thomas and 2 pale boys
 Defnics
 Dissidents
 Face Value
 H.G. Lewis
 Idiot Humans
 Les Black and the Amazing Pink Holes
 Lurid
 New Creatures
 Numbskull
 Offbeats
 The Pagans
 Pere Ubu
 Pink Holes
 Pistol Whip
 Prisoners
 Rocket From The Tombs
 Rubber City Rebels
 Step Sister
 The God Squad
 The New Christs
 The Other Kids
 THOR
 Tin Huey
 Unknown Instructors
 Vacancies

References

1991 establishments in Illinois
American independent record labels
Record labels disestablished in 2021
Record labels established in 1991